Ponnuswamy Sadayappan from the Ohio State University, Columbus, OH was named Fellow of the Institute of Electrical and Electronics Engineers (IEEE) in 2015 for contributions to parallel programming tools for high-performance computing.

References

Fellow Members of the IEEE
Living people
Year of birth missing (living people)
Place of birth missing (living people)
Ohio State University faculty
American electrical engineers